Thoropa miliaris is a species of frog in the family Cycloramphidae.
It is endemic to Brazil.
Its natural habitats are subtropical or tropical moist lowland forest, subtropical or tropical moist montane forest, rivers, rocky areas, and rocky shores.
It is threatened by habitat loss.

References

miliaris
Endemic fauna of Brazil
Amphibians of Brazil
Taxonomy articles created by Polbot
Amphibians described in 1824